Agasanal  is a village in the southern state of Karnataka, India. It is located in the Indi taluk of Bijapur district in Karnataka.

See also
 Bijapur district
 Districts of Karnataka
NH ೧೩ ROAD
this village have 2 temples.
1 madrashab temple
2.mallikarjun temple.
ABOUT VILLAGE
This village very near to city of bijapur its around 27 km from agasanal. and also its very near to horti village
this village on NH13 (mangalore to solapur road)

References

External links
 http://Bijapur.nic.in/

Villages in Bijapur district, Karnataka